Marianne McKenna, OC, FRAIC, OAA, OAQ, AIA, RIBA (born September 25, 1950) is a Canadian architect and a founding partner of KPMB Architects, a Toronto-based practice established in 1987. She is an invested Officer of The Order of Canada "for her contributions as an architect, designing structures that enrich the public realm". Her projects include the renovation and expansion of The Royal Conservatory TELUS Centre for Performance and Learning and Koerner Hall.  McKenna and KPMB were selected by The Brearley School, an independent all-girls school located in New York City, to lead the renovation of its building located on the Upper East Side. Her current projects also include for Banff Centre for Arts and Creativity in Banff, Alberta and an expansion and renovation of historic Massey Hall in Toronto  In 2010 she was named one of Canada’s Top 100 Most Powerful Women and in 2014 she was named one of Toronto’s top 50 Powerful People by MacLean’s Magazine.

Education and early career
McKenna was born in Montreal, Quebec in 1950. She graduated from The Study, a Canadian private education all-girls school in Westmount, Quebec in 1968 and was honoured by The Study in 2008 with the Judy Elder Alumna Award. To the students of The Study, she explained her choice to pursue architecture as follows: "I originally saw the profession as a balance between creative and business skills. I found out quite early that it is much more than that. It is a creative profession but requires the leadership skills of innovator, arbitrator, negotiator, communicator, along with strong design talent and business acumen. The pleasure of architecture is in the range of challenges that only increase from day to day."

McKenna is an alumnus of Swarthmore College (B.A. 1972) and has a Master of Architecture from Yale University (M.A., 1976), where she studied under architects Harry Cobb of Pei Cobb Freed & Partners and Charles Moore. At Yale University, she also met and became lifelong friends with then aspiring actress Meryl Streep. Streep shared insights on Marianne’s career as an architect in the 2014 documentary "Making Space: 5 Women Changing the Face of Architecture".

Upon graduation from Yale, McKenna worked for Bobrow & Fieldman, Architects in Montreal from 1976 to 1978 and Denys, Lasdun, Redhouse & Softely in London from 1978 to 1979. In 1980 she joined Barton Myers Associates (BMA) in Toronto and was made an associate the following year. At BMA she met her future partners, also associates of Myers: Bruce Kuwabara, Thomas Payne and Shirley Blumberg. Notable projects she worked on in this period include the Hasbro Inc. New York showrooms and 35 East Wacker Drive in Chicago.

Practice

When Barton Myers relocated his office to Los Angeles in 1987, McKenna formed Kuwabara Payne McKenna Blumberg Architects (KPMB Architects) with Bruce Kuwabara, Thomas Payne and Shirley Blumberg. Early in the practice, the editorial director of Progressive Architecture, Thomas R. Fisher, wrote: "...KPMB is particularly noteworthy because it has developed a more open, hybrid form of architecture and has taken the much more unusual step of structuring its practice along the same lines. The partnership, for example, is a mix of people of different genders, religious beliefs, ethnic backgrounds and political inclinations...theirs, in other words, is neither the autonomous individualism of the ‘star’ design firm nor the rather anonymous specialization of corporate-type firms, but a more diverse and less structured hybridization of those older models."

With her partners, McKenna developed an approach where each of the four partners is either in charge of their respective projects or collaborates strategically to combine strengths in leadership and design on large-scale, complex initiatives, leading teams through all phases from design concept to delivery. Simultaneous to the project work, the partnership shares responsibility for directing the strategy and management of all four core areas of practice: business development, design, finance, marketing and administration. In 2012, the name of the partnership changed to KPMB Architects. KPMB Architects is today recognized as a leading Canadian practice.

Projects and contributions

McKenna is responsible for the transformation and expansion of The Royal Conservatory into a cultural destination. Her work began with the 1990 Master Plan, continued for over a decade with phased and various projects including Ettore Mazzoleni Concert Hall and culminated in 2009 with the TELUS Performance and Learning Centre and the Michael and Sonja Koerner Hall. The design achieved numerous awards, including the Governor General’s Medal in 2012. For her outstanding contribution and commitment, Marianne was made an Honorary Fellow of the Royal Conservatory in 2011.

Reflecting on her work at the Conservatory, McKenna says, "The wonderful part of this project is the opportunity to overlay so many aspects of music, from the teaching and practicing of the students, to the performance of faculty and musicians from across the city and around the world. The buildings, both the historic stone fabric and the more contemporary fabric stretched across the site, become a crucible for amazing musical variations."

As partner-in-charge, McKenna has directed many of KPMB’s projects including the Rotman School of Management at the University of Toronto (2014 Governor General’s Award and Architectural Record "Good Design is Good Business Award"), the Jackson-Triggs Niagara Estate Winery in Niagara-on-the-Lake (Canada’s selection at the 2002 Green Building Challenge in Oslo, Norway); the Master Plan for Ryerson University (2010 American Institute of Architects Honor Award) and the Grand Valley Institution for Women (1997 Governor General's Award).

McKenna also developed and implemented the professional practice course at the University of Toronto’s John H. Daniels Faculty of Architecture, Landscape and Design. In the fall of 2016, she was the Lord Norman R. Foster Visiting Professor at Yale University and she currently serves on the Advisory Board for The McEwen School of Architecture at Laurentian University. In June 2017, Marianne received her Honorary Doctorate of Laws (honoris causa) degree from Laurentian University.

Notable projects

2020: Park Hyatt Toronto Renovation: 4 Avenue Road, Toronto, Ontario 
2020: Bloor Street United Church: 300 Bloor West, Toronto, Ontario
2020: Massey Hall Renovation and Expansion (Phase 2), Toronto, Ontario
2018: Lloyd Hall Renovation, Banff Centre for Art and Creativity, Banff, Alberta
2017: The Globe and Mail Office Interiors and Corporate Event Space, Toronto, Ontario
2017: Kellogg School of Management, Northwestern University, Evanston, Illinois
2016: Thornwood House, Toronto, Ontario
2015: Torys LLP Offices, Montreal, Quebec
2015: St. Michael's Cathedral Block Master Plan, Toronto, Ontario
2015: Massey Hall Renovation and Expansion (Phase 1), Toronto, Ontario
2013: Orchestra Hall Renewal, Minnesota Orchestra, Minneapolis, Minnesota
2013: Conrad Hotel, Lobby Interior/Custom Furniture/Standard Room Design, New York City. New York
2012: Roy Thompson Hall Wine Bar, Toronto, Ontario
2012: The Joseph L. Rotman School of Management Expansion, University of Toronto, Toronto, Ontario
2012: Mike & Ophelia Lazaridis Quantum-Nano Centre, University of Waterloo, Waterloo, Ontario
2012: Torys LLP Offices, Calgary, Alberta
2011: Guy-Metro Building Recladding, Concordia University, Montreal, Quebec (in joint venture with Fichten Soiferman et Associés Architectes)
2010: The Royal Conservatory of Music, Koerner Hall, Toronto, Ontario
2010: Rosedale Clubhouse Enhancement Feasibility Study, Toronto, Ontario
2009: The Royal Conservatory of Music, TELUS Centre for Performance and Learning, Toronto, Ontario 
2009: John Molson School of Business, Concordia University, Montreal, Quebec (in joint venture with Fichten Soiferman et Associés Architectes)
2009: Branksome Hall Master Plan Update, Toronto, Ontario
2008: Torys LLP Offices, Toronto, Ontario
2008: Ryerson University Master Plan, Toronto, Ontario (in joint venture with Daoust Lestage inc. and in association with Greenberg Consultants Inc. and IBI Group)
2008: CTV Executive Offices, Toronto, Ontario
2005: Woodbridge Office, Toronto, Ontario
2005: Engineering/Computer Science and Visual Arts Integrated Complex, Concordia University, Montreal, Quebec (in joint venture with Fichten Soiferman et Associés Architectes)
2003: McGill University and Génome Québec Innovation Centre, Montreal, Quebec (in joint venture with Fichten Soiferman et Associés Architectes)
2003: St. Andrew's College Aurora, Ontario
2002: Roy Thompson Hall Enhancement, Toronto, Ontario
2001: Jackson-Triggs Niagara Estate Winery, Niagara-on-the-Lake, Ontario 
1998: McKee Public School, North York, Ontario
1998: Mitchell Field Community Centre, North York, Ontario
1997: Indigo Books and Music, Retail Stores, Burlington, Toronto, Kingston, Ontario
1997: Ettore Mazzoleni Concert Hall at the Royal Conservatory of Music, Toronto, Ontario
1996: Grand Valley Institution for Women, Kitchener, Ontario
1995: Gluskin Sheff & Associates, Corporate Offices, Toronto, Ontario
1993: Kitchener City Hall, Kitchener, Ontario
1991: The Royal Conservatory of Music, Master Plan, Toronto, Ontario

References

External links 

 Finding aid for the Kuwabara Payne Mckenna Blumberg fonds, Canadian Centre for Architecture
 KPMB's biographical page on Marianne McKenna

1950 births
Living people
Architects from Montreal
Canadian women architects
Swarthmore College alumni
Yale School of Architecture alumni
Officers of the Order of Canada